Martina Hingis was the defending champion but lost in the semifinals to Venus Williams.

Williams won in the final 2–6, 6–4, 6–1 against Anna Kournikova.

Seeds
A champion seed is indicated in bold text while text in italics indicates the round in which that seed was eliminated. All thirty-two seeds received a bye to the second round.

  Martina Hingis (semifinals)
  Lindsay Davenport (quarterfinals)
  Jana Novotná (quarterfinals)
 n/a
  Monica Seles (third round)
  Amanda Coetzer (fourth round)
 n/a
  Arantxa Sánchez-Vicario (semifinals)
  Conchita Martínez (fourth round)
  Irina Spîrlea (second round)
  Venus Williams (champion)
  Nathalie Tauziat (fourth round)
  Sandrine Testud (fourth round)
  Anke Huber (fourth round)
  Dominique Van Roost (second round)
  Ai Sugiyama (third round)
  Patty Schnyder (fourth round)
  Sabine Appelmans (third round)
  Natasha Zvereva (third round)
  Ruxandra Dragomir (second round)
  Joannette Kruger (third round)
  Brenda Schultz-McCarthy (second round)
  Anna Kournikova (final)
  Barbara Paulus (third round)
  Yayuk Basuki (third round)
  Henrieta Nagyová (third round)
  Barbara Schett (second round)
  Naoko Sawamatsu (third round)
  Silvia Farina (quarterfinals)
  Maria Vento (fourth round)
  Florencia Labat (third round)
  Sarah Pitkowski (second round)
  Tamarine Tanasugarn (third round)
  Rita Grande (fourth round)

Draw

Finals

Top half

Section 1

Section 2

Section 3

Section 4

Bottom half

Section 5

Section 6

Section 7

Section 8

External links
 1998 Lipton Championships draw

Women's Singles
Lipton Championships - Women's Singles